is the debut single by Japanese duo Yoasobi from their debut EP, The Book (2021). It was released on December 15, 2019, through Sony Music Entertainment Japan. The song was based on Thanatos no Yūwaku ("An Invitation from Thanatos"), a short story written by Mayo Hoshino, and published on the novel-centered social media Monogatary.com, which won the Sony Music Award, and the Grand Prize from Monocon 2019.

The song and story depicts a man who is fascinated by a personification of death, Thanatos, who sent him a message "goodbye" and he tries to stop his girlfriend from suicide by jumping. The English version, titled "Into the Night", was released on July 2, 2021, the same day as their tenth single "Sangenshoku" and the stand-alone single version of "Encore", as Yoasobi's first English song. It was translated by Konnie Aoki.

Reception 
The accompanying music video of "Yoru ni Kakeru" was published on Ayase's YouTube channel on November 16, 2019 and its view count surpassed 10 million in 5 months. Soon after its release, the song topped the popularity charts on Spotify and Line Music, as well as went viral on social media such as TikTok during COVID-19 pandemic in Japan began.

"Yoru ni Kakeru" peaked at number one on the Billboard Japan Hot 100 for the issue date of June 1, 2020, and topped for three consecutive weeks, total six weeks. The song finished 2020 as the year's top Japan Hot 100 song, becoming the first single not released on CD to top the year-end chart. The song certified diamond for streaming by the Recording Industry Association of Japan (RIAJ) on October 25, 2021, making it the first ever diamond-certified song for streaming in RIAJ history.

Live performances
On May 15, 2020, Yoasobi's member Ikura appeared on the YouTube channel The First Take to perform the re-arranged version of "Yoru ni Kakeru", as The Home Take. Yoasobi gave the televised debut performance of "Yoru ni Kakeru" as a duo with band members at 71st NHK Kōhaku Uta Gassen on December 31, broadcast from Kadokawa Culture Center. During their first EP The Book promotion in 2021, they also performed the song at CDTV Live! Live! on January 18, alongside "Encore", and Music Station on January 22.

Accolades

Track listing
 Digital download and streaming
  – 4:21

 Digital download and streaming (English version)
 "Into the Night" – 4:22

Credits and personnel
Credits adapted from The Book liner notes.

 Ayase – songwriter, producer
 Ikura – vocals
 Takeruru – guitar
 Mayo Hoshino – based story writer
 Takayuki Saitō – vocal recording
 Masahiko Fukui – mixing
 Niina Ai – music video animation, cover artwork design

Charts

Weekly charts

Year-end charts

Certifications

Release history

See also
 List of Hot 100 number-one singles of 2020 (Japan)

References

External links 
 Thanatos no Yūwaku on Monogatary 
 An Invitation from Thanatos on the official website 

2019 debut singles
2019 songs
Billboard Japan Hot 100 number-one singles
Internet memes introduced in 2020
Japanese-language songs
Songs about nights
Songs about suicide
Sony Music Entertainment Japan singles
Viral videos
Yoasobi songs